Greathed is a surname. Notable people with the surname include: 

Edward Greathed (1812–1881), British Army officer
William Wilberforce Harris Greathed (1826–1878), senior officer in the Bengal Engineers

Other
Greathed Manor, Victorian country house in Dormansland, Surrey, England